Desert Valley Hospital (DVH) is an 148-bed osteopathic acute care facility in the city of Victorville, San Bernardino County, California. It serves the Victor Valley region of the south−central Mojave Desert.

DVH is currently owned and operated by Prime Healthcare Services, Inc. (PHS), a hospital management company located in Ontario, California. PHS was founded in 2001 by Prem Reddy, who is its present chairman of the board. The hospital is accredited by the American Osteopathic Association's Healthcare Facilities Accreditation Program.

History
The 1994 hospital groundbreaking ceremonies included Roy Rogers, a local resident in Apple Valley.

The hospital had 7,179 admissions, 1,070 inpatient procedures, 597 surgeries, and its emergency room had 32,392 visits in 2012.

Services
24-hour basic emergency
Cardiovascular-neurological
Cardiovascular laboratory
Imaging services - digital filmless radiology
Clinical laboratory
Critical care/Stepdown unit
Surgical services
Pharmacy
Outpatient physical therapy
Bio-medical

Controversy
In 2005, two former nurses at Desert Valley Hospital won a lawsuit in which they claimed they were improperly fired after they accused hospital management of providing inadequate care to save money and Reddy of repeatedly reporting to work while under the influence of alcohol. In February 1999, Reddy was arrested for allegedly attacking Dr. Harry Lifschutz at Desert Valley Medical Group. Reddy jumped over a desk in the doctor's waiting room and allegedly attempted to choke him and take a laptop from Lifschutz's office.

Awards and recognition
 Truven Health Analytics (formerly Thomson Reuters) Top 100 Hospital 7 years, including 2013.
Top Hospital of Top 10% of Pacificare's Hospital Quality Index amongst the hospitals in California
Highest Achievable Scores by American Osteopathic Association (AOA)
 Ranked #45 of California hospitals and #3 in the San Bernardino - Riverside, California, metropolitan area by U.S. News & World Report.

List of famous patients
Dale Evans
Roy Rogers

References

External links
Official Desert Valley Hospital website
Desert Valley Hospital in the CA Healthcare Atlas — a project by OSHPD.
Prime Healthcare Services, Inc.
Prem Reddy, MD, FACC, FCCP @ DVH

Hospitals in San Bernardino County, California
Osteopathic medicine
Prime Healthcare Services
Victorville, California
Victor Valley
Hospital buildings completed in 1994
Hospitals established in 1994
1994 establishments in California